Sister Josefa de los Dolores Peña y Lillo Barbosa, OP (also known as sor Josefa de los Dolores or sor Dolores Peña y Lillo, 12 March 1739 – 29 August 1823)
was a Dominican nun and a self-taught writer of the Chilean Colonial period ascribed to Catholic confessional discourse produced by Indian nuns in South American cloisters during the fifteenth and seventeenth centuries. She cultivated the epistolary genre, but also rarely wrote poetry.

She entered the religious life in 1751 against her parents' wishes, and began her literary production in 1763 probably by own choice. She is considered today "the best existing sources for the study of the Spanish language that was spoken during the Chilean Colonial period" and the most reliable source for diachronic linguistics. Despite her humble origins, she achieved great influence in the political world of the nascent Republican Chile, especially within government ministers during the Independence, who consulted her regularly.

Alongside the autobiography of Ursula Suarez and collections of poems by Juana López and Tadea de San Joaquín, the epistolary production of Sister Josefa is included today within the first female literary records in Chile that identify and express themselves "in the literate territory of the city and culture of eighteenth-century Chilean colonial society". This is not to say that during that period there were no more written texts by nuns, but probably many of them are gone by authors' request.

Biography 
There are little biographical data available on Josefa de los Dolores, most of which are available in the monastery's records where she lived, some hagiographic publications, and her own confessional handwritten letters.

She was born on 25 March 1739; and according to the clergyman and historian José Ignacio Eyzaguirre Portales, her parents were Ignacia Barbosa and Alonso Peña y Lillo, both of humble origin, who was sent her to "Beaterio Dominico de Santa Rosa de Lima"—latter named "Monasterio de Dominicas de Santa Rosa de Lima de Santiago de Chile"—at age of seven, to pursue music studies. On 18 December 1751, aged 12, she decided to enter the convent as a postulant without her parents' permission, made a vow of perpetual chastity at 15 and on 15 October 1756, she made her formal profession as a white veil nun under the tutelage of the Prioress Maria Antonia Wandin, thereby becoming a fully recognized member of the religious community.

She lived in the monastery until her death in the first half of the 1820s: the historian Eyzaguirre in his 1850s "Historia eclesiástica, política y literaria de Chile, Tomo II" (Ecclesiastical, Political, and Literary History of Chile, Volume II) indicates that it was on 29 August 1823, while Raïssa Kordic, the editor of her work, indicates that she died on 27 August 1822, aged 83.

Literary work

Historical context 
Nuns' writings in colonial convents were a common practice in South American subcontinent, not only because it allowed to reinforce faith or because it was done "for confessional mandate", but also because it allowed "to express some concerns or dissatisfactions against the lived reality" for including issues related to material and spiritual life that they had within the convent.

In this context, literary works by nuns were framed and developed in Chilean convents and monasteries during the colonial period until the 19th century; these included spiritual letters, diaries, autobiographies and epistolaries. Highlighted in these genres Tadea de San Joaquín, Úrsula Suárez and Josefa de los Dolores, whose works became the best known of its kind in the South American region, along with those of Capuchin Sister Maria Jacinta from cloister of Our Lady of the Pillar in Buenos Aires, possibly dating back to the 1820s.

Characteristics of her work 
Her literary output was based on a series of epistolary letters sent to her confessor Manuel José Álvarez López (1701–1773) of the Society of Jesus—with whom the convent remained a close connection—probably in a period between 15 March 1763, and 7 March 1769, or such later date (as several letters contain no precise data).

In 1923, the existence of these manuscripts was first mentioned by the historian José Toribio Medina in History. Letters of women in Chile, 1630–1885, but without a philological or linguistical point of view and with a short, imprecise descriptive character. Their rescue, analysis and publication started in the 2000s thanks to funding from the National Commission for Scientific and Technological Research, CONICYT.

Genre 
According to its literary technique, tone, content or length, her literary work is considered part of the epistolary genre, and constitutes "the only so far known in Chile, of significant size, that remains whole", while the subgenre is the letter.

Several investigators "undearscore the letter's value as a 'technique' of confession, guided self-analysis, self-knowledge, self-development, and management of the cloistered nuns' inner life". In the case of Sister Josefa de los Dolores, such writings have enabled to know their discursive production, and have allowed to include her in the group of the first female literates in Chile.

Corpus 
The letters were discovered in the archives of the monastery by the researcher and theorist Raïssa Kordic, who rescued over a hundred epistles "written in tiny italics, and developed in booklets of four to eight pages" that probably do not constitute all of her written work.

Such correspondence was held by the Jesuit priest Manuel Álvarez until his departure from Chile in unspecified date due to the expulsion of the Jesuits; those missives passed into the hands of the Bishop and his successors until 1861, when the Prioress of the time requested them: their content was partially censured and then were returned to the monastery. In the early 2000s, an academic group from the University of Chile began a rescue process.

Then in 2008, an edition containing 65 letters was published under the title of the "Epistolary of Sister Dolores Peña y Lillo (Chile, 1763–1769)" that included a critical analysis.

Notes

References

Bibliography 

 

1739 births
1823 deaths
Chilean women poets
Roman Catholic writers
18th-century Chilean women writers
Chilean Roman Catholic religious sisters and nuns
18th-century Chilean writers
Chilean Dominicans
Chilean non-fiction writers